Senator Hayne may refer to:

Members of the United States Senate
Arthur P. Hayne (1788–1867), U.S. Senator from South Carolina in 1858
Robert Y. Hayne (1791–1839), U.S. Senator from South Carolina in 1823

United States state senate members
Charles D. Hayne (1844–1913), South Carolina State Senate
Henry E. Hayne (fl. 1870s), South Carolina State Senate

See also
Senator Haynes (disambiguation)